There are more than 20,000 Grade II* listed buildings in England. This page is a list of these buildings in the district of South Northamptonshire in Northamptonshire.

South Northamptonshire

|}

Notes

External links

 
Lists of Grade II* listed buildings in Northamptonshire
South Northamptonshire District